The Western District comprises western regions of the Australian state of Victoria. It is said to be an illdefined district, sometimes incorrectly referred to as an economic region,. The district is located within parts of the Barwon South West and the Grampians regions; extending from the south-west corner of the state to Ballarat in the east and as far north as Ararat. The district is bounded by the Wimmera district in the north, by the Goldfields district in the east, by Bass Strait and the Southern Ocean in the south, and by the South Australian border in the west. The district is well known for the production of wool. The most populated city in the Western District is the Ballarat region, with 96,940 inhabitants.

The principal centres of the district are: Warrnambool, Hamilton, Colac, Portland, Casterton, Port Fairy, Camperdown, and Terang. Other cities and towns in or on the edge of the district include:
Coleraine, Merino, Heywood, Dunkeld, Penshurst, Macarthur, Koroit, Allansford, Ararat, Willaura, Beaufort, Learmonth, Ballarat, Snake Valley, Skipton, Moyston, Linton, Derrinallum, Lismore, Mortlake, Noorat, Cobden, Timboon, Beeac, Cororooke, Birregurra, Apollo Bay, and Lorne.

Geology
It consists of a nearly flat volcanic plain created by a number of quite recently active volcanoes, the best known being Mount Eccles, Mount Richmond and Mount Gambier. Whilst some of them (e.g. Mount Richmond) have given rise to cemented pyroclastic rocks that do not produce fertile soils, others have given rise to fertile Andisols that make the district the best grazing land in Australia, as well as highly suitable for the production of vegetable crops. Away from the volcanoes, soils are of moderate to low fertility and many are sandy, supporting heathland flora like the Grampians. Drainage is very poor and most rivers flow only after prolonged periods of steady rain, resulting in remarkably variable flow when the low variability of the climate is taken into account. The major mountain range is the Otway Ranges, which straddle the boundary between the Western District and Port Phillip District.

Climate
The climate is mild to warm and generally humid to sub-humid.

History

The Western District was well-populated by Aboriginal Victorians at the time colonisation began.  For example, the ancestors of the Gunditjmara people lived in villages of weather-proof houses with stone walls a metre high, located near eel traps and aquaculture ponds at Lake Condah and elsewhere - on just one hectare of Allambie Farm, archaeologists have discovered the remains of 160 house sites.

Pioneer Edward Henty wrote in his diary on 3 December 1834:
Pulled [rowed] over in the whale boat to Dutton's River. Light wind from the N.E. Very warm. Arrived at 6 p.m., made the boat fast in the middle of the river, and started three days' walk in the bush accompanied by H Camfield, Wm Dutton, five men, one black woman and 14 dogs, each man with a gun and sufficient quantity of damper to last for the voyage.

In the 5 December entry Henty wrote:
On descending the hill we saw a native. He immediately ran on seeing us. He was busily employed pulling the gums from the wattle trees.
 
Both the Henty brothers and Captain Griffiths (who settled at Port Fairy in 1836), combined whaling and farming. The district was explored by Thomas Mitchell in 1836 who identified the area's potential for grazing. Charles Tyers was the first to survey the area in 1839.  Sheep were first brought to the district in 1836 by Thomas Manifold at Port Henry, near Geelong, and rapidly occupied the whole district.  By 1840 squatters occupied almost all the district.

The first settlers avoided the Western District (preferring the forest country further west), as its countryside was then exceptionally dry: tussocks were so scanty it was said one could walk to Geelong without stepping on grass. Runoff after rainfall was rapid, and it was claimed that only after cattle had firmed the soil that the grass began to thicken. The regional climate also became much wetter.

Aboriginal dispossession
With pastoral land in the colony of Van Diemen's Land fully allocated to colonists, John Batman turned his attention to mainland land speculation at the vast grasslands of Port Phillip Bay, which began in 1835 without the consent of the British Crown. With no legal recognition or protection of the Aboriginal inhabitants, some cases of violence occurred. For example, in August 1836, some Aboriginal people killed the squatter Charles Franks and an unnamed shepherd, at Franks' station on the Werribee River (near Melbourne). In response, Henry Batman (John Batman's brother) led an indiscriminate punitive expedition against a group of 70-80 Aboriginal people (men, women & children) living in 9 large huts on the Werribee River, killing an unrecorded number. In spite of this, in May 1837, Henry Batman "...was appointed acting Commissioner of Crown Lands, the official charged with overseeing the squatters." Earlier, on 4 March 1837, Governor Bourke in his visit to Melbourne addressed 120 Aboriginal people, "...whom he exhorted...to good conduct and attention to the Missionary.' The Kulin were given blankets and four favoured men, who had been recommended for 'honorary distinctions' by [Police Magistrate Captain William] Lonsdale, were awarded brass plates."

By 1839, large numbers of homeless Aboriginal people from surrounding pastoral districts, were "....surviving whenever and however they could on the geographic, social and economic margins of the town [ie, Melbourne]." When Chief Protector of Aborigines George Augustus Robinson arrived in the town in the winter of 1839, "four to five hundred blacks of the Port Phillip tribes" were gathering at a camp site on the south bank of the Yarra River, suffering hunger and disease. By 1840, Robinson still "....had no stores allocated to him..." by Captain Lonsdale, the Police Magistrate in Melbourne, even though "...it was patently obvious that the Aborigines were starving, and many were ill and near death..." With land in the hinterland overrun by "...vast numbers of sheep and cattle.." and "...conditions in the countryside becoming intolerable, the blacks swarmed into Melbourne looking for food and blankets."

Between 1836 and 1842, Victorian Aboriginal groups were largely dispossessed of hunting grounds larger than the whole of England.

Eumeralla Wars

In the Portland area in the 1840s, the Gunditjmara fought for their hunting grounds in a series of clashes known as the Eumeralla Wars, in which both they and colonists experienced violent deaths. The Gunditjmara resistance became overwhelmed by the colonisers who brought in the Native Police - an organisation consisting of highly skilled Aboriginal men dedicated to keeping the peace in their native land.  The historian Jan Critchett has documented this conflict in her 1990 book, A distant field of murder: Western district frontiers, 1834-1848.

Aftermath
The colonization of the Western District had huge impacts beyond the immediate district. By January 1844, there were said to be 675 Aborigines resident in squalid camps in Melbourne. Although the British Colonial Office appointed 5 "Aboriginal Protectors" for the entire Aboriginal population of Victoria, arriving in Melbourne in 1839, they worked "...within a land policy that nullified their work, and there was no political will to change this." "It was government policy to encourage squatters to take possession of whatever Aboriginal land they chose,....that largely explains why almost all the original inhabitants of Port Phillip's vast grasslands were dead so soon after 1835". By 1845, fewer than 240 wealthy Europeans held all the pastoral licences then issued in Victoria and became the patriarchs "...that were to wield so much political and economic power in Victoria  for generations to come."

With the Aboriginal population dispossessed of hunting grounds and their centuries-old management of fire having been disrupted for almost 15 years, the Colony experienced for the first time its largest ever bushfires, burning about 25% of the land area of Victoria on Black Thursday (1851) on 6 February 1851.

Missions
Missionaries sought to relocate Gunditjmara people of the west to a mission established further east near Purnim in 1861, however, the Gunditjmara from the Portland region refused because of tension with rival Aboriginal clans from the eastern boundary of Gunditjmara country and beyond the Hopkins River. Five years later in 1866,  of Crown land at Lake Condah was set aside for use as an Aboriginal mission. This land was gazetted as a reserve in 1869 and an Anglican mission was established. In 1951, the Lake Condah reserve, with the exception of three small areas, was revoked and the land was handed over to the Soldiers Settlement Commission.

Towards recognition of Aboriginal rights

In 1980, the Gunditjmara launched Onus v. Alcoa, taking legal action in the Supreme Court of Victoria to prevent Alcoa of Australia Ltd from damaging or interfering with Gunditjmara cultural sites located on the same place as the proposed aluminium smelter at Portland. The Supreme Court dismissed their subsequent application for leave to appeal to the Federal Court. However, the Gunditjmara took the matter to the High Court of Australia where they were successful. High Court Chief Justice Gibbs judged that: "The appellants have an interest in the subject matter of the present action which is greater than that of other members of the public and indeed greater than that of other persons of Aboriginal descent who are not members of the Gournditch-jmara people. The applicants and other members of the Gournditch-jmara [ie, the Gunditjmara] people would be more particularly affected than other members of the Australian community by the destruction of the relics".

On 30 March 2007, the Gunditjmara were recognised by the Federal Court of Australia to be the native title-holders of almost  of Crown land and waters in the Portland area. On 27 July 2011, together with the Eastern Maar people, the Gunditjmara people were recognised to be the native title-holders of almost  of Crown land in the Yambuk region, including Lady Julia Percy Island, known to them as Deen Maar.

Primary production
Wheat was grown in the drier northern part of the district for some time until more easily managed soils in the Wimmera were developed. Dairying was developed as a major industry in the wetter southern parts during this period, as was the cultivation of potatoes and onions on the best soils.

In the Otway Ranges, forestry became the major industry, especially after the building of the Great Ocean Road which opened up these very wet areas. Because of the change in focus since the late 1960s to woodchipping, many timber mills are now defunct as jobs have moved to Geelong. Tourism is the dominant industry in towns such as Lorne and Apollo Bay, which fill up during the summer as Melburnians are drawn by the stunning scenery and milder weather. In towns like Heywood and Nelson, pine plantations have been the dominant industry since the 1950s but the industry, even as plantations mature, is under threat due to poor prices.

See also
Kanawinka Geopark

References

Further reading

 
District, Western
Grampians (region)